Prelude to Madness or Loveless Lovers (Italian: Amanti senza amore) is a 1948 Italian drama film directed by Gianni Franciolini and starring Clara Calamai, Roldano Lupi and Jean Servais. It is inspired by the 1889 novella The Kreutzer Sonata by Leo Tolstoy.

The film's sets were designed by the art director Piero Gherardi. Location shooting took place in Orvieto and San Remo. It earned around 55 million lira at the box office.

Cast 
 Clara Calamai as Elena Leonardi
 Roldano Lupi as Piero Leonardi
 Jean Servais as Enrico Miller – il violinista
 Maria Melvin as Madre di Elena
 Lucio Marsaglia as Direttore del Casinò
 Ivo Sogliano as Segretario di Miller

References

Bibliography 
 Chiti, Roberto & Poppi, Roberto. Dizionario del cinema italiano: Dal 1945 al 1959. Gremese Editore, 1991.
 Gundle, Stephen. Fame Amid the Ruins: Italian Film Stardom in the Age of Neorealism. Berghahn Books, 2019.

External links 
 

1948 films
Italian drama films
1948 drama films
1940s Italian-language films
Films directed by Gianni Franciolini
Lux Film films
1940s Italian films

fr:Amanti senza amore
it:Amanti senza amore